The Punjab Public Service Commission (PPSC) is a government agency responsible for hiring and administering the provincial civil services and management services in the Punjab Province of Pakistan.

History 
The Punjab Public Service Commission, established in April 1937, is the oldest Provincial Public Service Commission in Pakistan. It was established under the Punjab Public Service Commission Ordinance, of 1978. It functions in accordance with the ambit of the Punjab Public Service Commission Ordinance, 1978, and Punjab Public Service Commission (Functions) Rules, 1979.

See also 
 Federal Public Service Commission
 Sindh Public Service Commission
 Khyber Pakhtunkhwa Public Service Commission
 Balochistan Public Service Commission
 Azad Jammu and Kashmir Public Service Commission

References

External links
 
Government agencies of Punjab, Pakistan
Provincial public service commissions of Pakistan